Hévízgyörk is a village in Pest county, Hungary.

Hévízgyörk honlapja

Hévízgyörk a Wikipédián

References

Populated places in Pest County